Theodelap or Theudelapius was one of the sons of Faroald, the first Duke of Spoleto. After the death of Ariulf in 601 or 602, Theodelap and his brother fought for the throne.  Theodelap won and was crowned duke. He held the dukedom for more than half a century, until his death. His reign was nevertheless uneventful and he appears to have been largely or completely independent of royal authority throughout. He was succeeded by Atto.

Notes

Sources
 Paul the Deacon. Historia Langobardorum.

Dukes of Spoleto
7th-century Lombard people
7th-century rulers in Europe
6th-century births
652 deaths
Year of birth unknown